Michael John York (born 16 October 1967 in Tamworth, NSW) is a former field hockey defender from Australia, who participated in four Summer Olympics for his native country, starting in 1988. From 1992 on, at each appearance the skilled veteran won a medal.

External links
 
 
 
 

1967 births
Australian male field hockey players
Male field hockey defenders
Olympic field hockey players of Australia
Olympic silver medalists for Australia
Olympic bronze medalists for Australia
Field hockey players at the 1988 Summer Olympics
Field hockey players at the 1992 Summer Olympics
Field hockey players at the 1996 Summer Olympics
1998 Men's Hockey World Cup players
Field hockey players at the 2000 Summer Olympics
Living people
People from Tamworth, New South Wales
Olympic medalists in field hockey
Medalists at the 2000 Summer Olympics
Medalists at the 1996 Summer Olympics
Medalists at the 1992 Summer Olympics
Commonwealth Games medallists in field hockey
Commonwealth Games gold medallists for Australia
ACT Academy of Sport alumni
Field hockey players at the 1998 Commonwealth Games
1990 Men's Hockey World Cup players
Sportsmen from New South Wales
20th-century Australian people
Field hockey people from New South Wales
Medallists at the 1998 Commonwealth Games